Matrix Biology is a peer-reviewed scientific journal in the field of matrix biology. The journal is published 8 times per year by Elsevier. The journal was established in 1981 as Collagen and Related Research and renamed to Matrix: Collagen and Related Research in 1988, before obtaining its current name in 1994. It is an official journal of the American Society for Matrix Biology and the International Society for Matrix Biology. The current editor-in-chief is Renato V. Iozzo (Thomas Jefferson University).

Abstracting and indexing 
Matrix Biology is abstracted and indexed in BIOBASE, Biochemistry and Biophysics Citation Index, Biological & Agricultural Index, Biological Abstracts, BIOSIS Previews, Chemical Abstracts Service, Current Advances in Ecological and Environmental Sciences, Current Awareness in Biological Sciences, Current Contents, EMBASE, EMBiology, Genetics Abstracts, MEDLINE, Science Citation Index, and Scopus. According to the Journal Citation Reports, the journal has a 2016 impact factor of 7.400.

References

External links
 

Publications established in 1981
Elsevier academic journals
Biology journals
English-language journals
8 times per year journals